Fabian Lysell (born 19 January 2003) is a Swedish professional ice hockey forward for the Providence Bruins in the American Hockey League (AHL) as a prospect to the Boston Bruins of the National Hockey League (NHL). Lysell was selected by the Boston Bruins in the first round, 21st overall, of the 2021 NHL Entry Draft.

Playing career
Lysell was selected 30th overall by the Vancouver Giants in 2020 CHL Import Draft. Lysell scored 13 points in 11 games for Frölunda at the J20 Nationell level.

On 10 August 2021, Lysell was signed by the Boston Bruins to a three-year, entry-level contract.

Career statistics

Regular season and playoffs

International

References

External links
 

2003 births
Living people
Boston Bruins draft picks
Frölunda HC players
Luleå HF players
National Hockey League first-round draft picks
Ice hockey people from Gothenburg
Providence Bruins players
Swedish ice hockey players